La Vingtaine du Douet is one of the three vingtaines of the Parish of Saint John in Jersey, Channel Islands.

It includes the coastline that covers Sorel and its lighthouse and the quarries at Ronez.

The Vingtaine de Hérupe, Vingtaine du Nord and Vingtaine du Douet all form a single electoral district of St John.

Douet
Saint John, Jersey